Peñafiel may refer to:
 Peñafiel, Spain
 Peñafiel Castle, Spain
 Peñafiel (mineral water), a Mexican mineral water brand

People
Constance of Peñafiel
Juan Manuel, Duke of Peñafiel

See also
Torre de Peñafiel
Canalejas de Peñafiel
Olmos de Peñafiel